Pedro Pablo León García (29 June 1943 – 9 May 2020), also known as Pedro "Perico" León, was a Peruvian footballer.

Career
León made 49 appearances for the Peru national football team between 1963 and 1973. He then started in the 1970 FIFA World Cup for the Peru national football team, along with Teófilo Cubillas, Roberto Challe and Hugo Sotil.

At club level, León played most of his career for Alianza Lima in Peru. He also played in Ecuador for Barcelona Sporting Club and in Venezuela for Deportivo Galicia.

Perico León was a strong striker of playful skills and a unique ability to effectively use the score with his head. His ability to create technical plays often allowed him to go back and aid his teammates, thus making him quite a complete player with the possibility to serve as both a good midfielder and an excellent forward. Due to this, Pedro Pablo León is often considered one of the best forwards in the history of Peruvian football. He lived in Miami, Florida, and enjoyed watching his grandson Brian Jair León play soccer for the Varsity high school soccer team in Nevada. His grandson is following in his grandfather's footsteps of becoming a professional footballer.

Honours

Individual awards

Peruvian League: Top Scorer 1963, 1967

References

External links

1943 births
2020 deaths
Footballers from Lima
Association football forwards
Peruvian footballers
Peru international footballers
Peruvian Primera División players
Club Alianza Lima footballers
Barcelona S.C. footballers
Deportivo Municipal footballers
Juan Aurich footballers
1970 FIFA World Cup players
Peruvian expatriate footballers
Expatriate footballers in Ecuador
Expatriate footballers in Venezuela
Peruvian expatriate sportspeople in Ecuador
Peruvian expatriate sportspeople in Venezuela